Thibault Dubarry (born 24 November 1987 in Chartres, France) is a French professional rugby union player. He plays at Number 8 for Racing Métro in the Top 14.

References

External links
Ligue Nationale De Rugby Profile
European Professional Club Rugby Profile
Racing Metro Profile

French rugby union players
Racing 92 players
Living people
1987 births
Rugby union number eights